Xabier Mancisidor Macazaga (born 24 May 1970) is a Spanish retired footballer who played as a goalkeeper, and is the current goalkeeping coach of English club Manchester City.

Playing career
Known simply as Xabier during his playing days, he was born in Pasaia, Gipuzkoa, Basque Country, and was a Deportivo Alavés youth graduate. He was promoted to the first team ahead of the 1993–94 campaign, in Segunda División B.

In 1995, despite being a backup option, Xabier signed for Segunda División side RCD Mallorca. He made his professional debut on 3 September of that year, starting in a 2–0 away win against CA Osasuna.

Xabier achieved promotion with Mallorca in 1997, playing two matches during the season. In the subsequent La Liga campaign, he was only a third-choice, and after failing to appear in a single minute, he retired at the age of only 28.

Coaching career
Immediately after retiring, Mancisidor joined Real Sociedad's backroom staff. Initially a goalkeeping coach of the youth setup, he was later promoted to the first team and spent 11 seasons at the club.

Mancisidor was appointed goalkeeping coach at Manuel Pellegrini's staff at Real Madrid on 2 June 2009. On 3 January 2011, he was named on Pellegrini's staff at Málaga CF, with the same role.

On 14 June 2013, Mancisidor again followed Pellegrini to Manchester City. After the manager's dismissal, he remained at the club.

References

External links

1970 births
Living people
People from Pasaia
Spanish footballers
Footballers from the Basque Country (autonomous community)
Association football goalkeepers
Segunda División B players
Segunda División players
Deportivo Alavés B players
Deportivo Alavés players
RCD Mallorca players
Manchester City F.C. non-playing staff